Benjamin R. Donolow (May 24, 1917 – November 27, 1972) was an American politician from Pennsylvania who served as a Democratic member of the Pennsylvania State Senate for the 2nd district from 1954 to 1972.

Early life
He graduated from Temple School of Law in 1941.  He helped supplement his tuition by working as a song and dance comic at banquets and bar mitzvahs. He served in the U.S. Army during World War II.  After leaving the Army, he became a trial lawyer.

Career
He was first elected to the Pennsylvania Senate in 1954 and served until 1972. 
He served as Chairman of the Appropriations Committee and Vice Chairman of the Judicial Committee.  He served as Senate minority leader from 1965 to 1970.  He served as a delegate to the 1964 Democratic National Convention.

He died on November 27, 1972 and is interred at Har Zion Cemetery in Collingdale, Pennsylvania.

References

External links

1917 births
1972 deaths
United States Army personnel of World War II
Burials in Pennsylvania
Democratic Party Pennsylvania state senators
Politicians from Philadelphia
Military personnel from Philadelphia
Temple University Beasley School of Law alumni
20th-century American politicians